Tikshan Sood (born 19 September 1954) is an Indian politician who was elected for three consecutive terms to the Punjab Legislative Assembly, India, as a Bharatiya Janata Party candidate.

Early life and education
Tikshan Sud was born in Hoshiarpur district in Punjab, India. He was educated at Panjab University, from where he was awarded Bachelor of Science and Bachelor of Law degrees and also a Masters in Political Science. He married Rakesh Sud and has one son and two daughters and resides in Hoshiarpur.

Political career
Sud was the Secretary of the Akhil Bhartiya Vidyarthi Parishad, Chandigarh from 1973 to 1976. In 1977, he became the President of the Akhil Bhartiya Vidyarthi Parishad, Hoshiarpur and presided up till 1980. Subsequently, he became the President of the Bharat Vikas Parishad, Hoshiarpur in 1983 and remained so up till 1990. He was the District President of BJP, Hoshiarpur from 1995 to 1997.

Elections contested

Sud was elected as MLA from Hoshiarpur constituency in the 1997 Punjab state assembly election and was inducted as State Minister for Excise & Taxation in SAD-BJP alliance Government in Punjab formed in 2000.

Sud was re-elected as MLA from Hoshiarpur in the 2002 Punjab state assembly election and was inducted as BJP Group Leader in the Punjab legislative assembly and also became a member of the BJP National Executive. He was re-elected as MLA from Hoshiarpur in the 2007 Punjab state assembly election and was inducted as a Cabinet Minister for Parliamentary Affairs, Medical Education and Research, Forests and Wildlife Preservation wing of the Agriculture department and Labour. Sud held all these portfolios simultaneously.

Sud lost the 2012 Punjab state assembly election but he was appointed the Political Advisor to the Chief Minister of Punjab from 2013 to 2017. He lost again in Hoshiarpur in 2017.

References 

Punjab, India MLAs 1997–2002
Punjab, India MLAs 2002–2007
Punjab, India MLAs 2007–2012
Bharatiya Janata Party politicians from Punjab
State cabinet ministers of Punjab, India
1954 births
Living people